The Women's sprint competition at the 2018 UCI Track Cycling World Championships was held on 1 and 2 March 2018.

Results

Qualifying
The top four riders advanced directly to the 1/8 finals; places 5 to 28 advanced to the 1/16 final.

 Q = qualified directly for 1/8 finals
 q = qualified for 1/16 finals

1/16 finals
Heat winners advanced to the 1/8 finals.

Q = qualified for 1/8 finals

1/8 finals
Heat winners advanced to the quarterfinals.

Quarterfinals
Matches are extended to a best-of-three format hereon; winners proceed to the semifinals.

Semifinals
Matches were extended to a best-of-three format hereon; winners proceeded to the final.

Finals
The final classification was determined in the medal finals.

References

Women's sprint
UCI Track Cycling World Championships – Women's sprint